Kari Kataja (born 23 April 1966) is a Finnish biathlete. He competed in the men's 20 km individual event at the 1992 Winter Olympics.

References

External links
 

1966 births
Living people
Finnish male biathletes
Olympic biathletes of Finland
Biathletes at the 1992 Winter Olympics
People from Pälkäne
Sportspeople from Pirkanmaa